Pokojišče is a small village in the Municipality of Vrhnika in the Inner Carniola region of Slovenia.

Geography
Pokojišče lies on the karst Menišija Plateau at a point where various routes intersect to Verd, Laze pri Borovnici, Padež, and Cerknica.

Name
Pokojišče was mentioned in written sources in 1763–87 as Pokoinik. The name of the village comes from the common noun pokojišče 'resting place' and refers to the physical location of the village at a level point along the route between Borovnica and the Menišija Plateau, which offered a place for rest during the ascent.

History

A transport route to Cerknica already passed through Pokojišče in the distant past, traversing land owned by the monastery in Bistra. A house in the village with the oeconym Colnar (literally, 'toll collector') is reminiscent of the route, and a plaque bearing the coat of arms of the 17th-century provincial clerk Wolfgang Markowitsch is built into the structure. During the Second World War, on September 26, 1942, Italian forces burned all but the largest house in the village.

Mass grave
It contains the remains of undetermined victims; spelunkers found a human skull in the cave.

Church

The local church in the settlement is dedicated to Saint Stephen and belongs to the Parish of Borovnica. It dates from the beginning of the 17th century.

References

External links

Pokojišče on Geopedia

Populated places in the Municipality of Vrhnika